The Canadian national netball team is the national netball team of Canada. Canada has both men's and women's national teams. Netball Canada is Canada's national governing body for the sport. The national team was first formed in the latter half of the 20th century.

Canada's national netball teams are selected through a trials process and compete on the world stage through the regional Americas Federation of Netball Associations (AFNA) competitions and qualifying tournaments to gain entry into the Commonwealth Games and the world netball championships called the Netball World Cup. The Netball World Cup was previously called the "World Netball Championships" from 1963–2011.

Canada's best result in the world championships came in 1991 when they came 6th. Canada's first netball win at the Commonwealth Games was in the Manchester 2002 Commonwealth Games when they beat Sri Lanka 52–49. At the 2012 Americas Federation of Netball Associations (AFNA) Tournament in Trinidad and Tobago, the Canadian national team came 5th. 
 One of the top performances of the Canadian women's team was at the 2nd World Youth Netball Championship in 2008 when they came in third.

As of 2 December 2019, Canada was 32nd in the World Netball Rankings. The team participates in the Netball World Cup, the international championship tournament for netball. This international tournament is considered the highest level of competition for the sport.

History
Netball is a team ball sport and a variant of basketball for women and girls which was the result of a misinterpretation of James Naismith's rules for playing basketball by Clara Baer, though modifications made by Martina Bergman-Österberg eventually had influence as well. The sport is played primarily in English-speaking countries and was originally considered a Commonwealth immigrant sport but was gradually introduced into school programs. After its initial development in England in the late 1800s to early 1900s, the sport spread throughout the Commonwealth and was introduced into Canada in the early 1960s. The first netball games played in Canada took place in Montréal in 1962. The "Canadian Amateur Netball Association", now called "Netball Canada", was formed in 1973 and held the first national Canadian netball championship in 1975 which is now known as the Netball Canada National Championships. Today, netball is played mainly in Québec, Ontario, Alberta and British Columbia.

Teams

2012
The 2012 Team Canada members are below. Canada is a member of the INF Americas region, with Americas Federation of Netball Associations (AFNA) being the lead agency.

2014

2014 AFNA Tournament
Six national teams joined Canada in the 2014 AFNA Championship Tournament, held in Calgary. It was the first time that Canada hosted the tournament. The AFNA tournament serves as the World Netball Americas regional qualifying event for the Netball World Cup, where only the top 2 teams qualify. The following national teams took part: Canada, Barbados, Trinidad & Tobago, Argentina, Cayman Islands, Grenada, USA. After 7 days of action, Trinidad & Tobago took the gold medal, Barbados taking silver. Canada's final standing was 4th, thus missing out on the upcoming 2015 Netball World Cup in Sydney, Australia.

Results

References

National netball teams of the Americas
Netball
Netball in Canada